Miles Templeman was Director General of the Institute of Directors (IoD), the business organisation that represents and sets standards for company directors, between 2004 and 2011.

Career

Miles Templeman began his career as a marketing specialist, leading such major consumer brands as Daz, Ribena, Lucozade and Levi jeans.  He then moved to general management and became Managing Director of Threshers and then the Whitbread Beer Company.  He had great success in building those companies, especially with the growth of such brands as Boddingtons and Stella Artois.

Board roles

He went on to hold a series of non-executive directorships and consultancy roles - including Royal Mail, Ben Sherman and Accenture - before becoming Chief Executive of Bulmers, which was eventually sold successfully to Scottish & Newcastle. Alongside his IoD role, Miles Templeman was non-executive Chairman at restaurant chain YO! Sushi. He was a non-executive director on the board of Shepherd Neame, the Kentish family brewer, and Melrose plc.

Personal interests

Miles Templeman describes himself as a firm believer in the power of the brand and the importance of valuing your team. He is a passionate supporter of enterprise and of the importance of strengthening the UK’s skills and education system.

On Wednesday 13 July 2011, Miles was awarded an Honorary Fellowship by Liverpool John Moores University in recognition of his outstanding contribution to the UK economy and university business engagement.

References

External links 
The Institute of Directors' website

British businesspeople
Living people
Year of birth missing (living people)